The Order of the Charity Cross is an Order of the Republic of Srpska. It was established in 1993 by the Constitution of Republika Srpska and 'Law on orders and awards' valid since 28 April 1993.

The Order of the Charity Cross has one class and is awarded to collectives and individuals for sacrifice and courage in care of the wounded and sick during combat. In peace it is awarded only for exceptional deeds.

Notable recipients

 2012 - Ljiljana Rikić
 2008 - Smilja i Milan Vidović
 1998 - Prof. dr Mladen Goronja

See also 
 Orders, decorations and medals of Republika Srpska

References

Orders, decorations, and medals of Republic of Srpska
Awards established in 1993